Hightstown is a borough in Mercer County, in the U.S. state of New Jersey. As of the 2020 United States census, the borough's population was 5,900, an increase of 406 (+7.4%) from the 2010 census count of 5,494, which in turn reflected an increase of 278 (+5.3%) from the 5,216 counted in the 2000 census.

Hightstown was incorporated as a borough by an act of the New Jersey Legislature on March 5, 1853, within portions of East Windsor Township. The borough became fully independent around 1894. Additional portions of East Windsor Township were annexed in 1913, 1915 and 1927. The traditional explanation is that the borough was named for John and Mary Hight, who established a tavern in the area in the 1750s.

Geography

According to the United States Census Bureau, the borough had a total area of 1.27 square miles (3.28 km2), including 1.23 square miles (3.19 km2) of land and 0.03 square miles (0.09 km2) of water (2.60%).

The borough is an independent municipality surrounded entirely by East Windsor, making it part one of 21 pairs of "doughnut towns" in the state, where one municipality entirely surrounds another.

Hightstown is at the central-most point of New Jersey and is roughly equidistant from Philadelphia and New York City.

Ecology
According to the A. W. Kuchler U.S. potential natural vegetation types, Hightstown, New Jersey would have an Appalachian Oak (104) vegetation type with an Eastern Hardwood Forest (25) vegetation form.

Climate
According to the Köppen climate classification system, Hightstown, New Jersey has a hot-summer, wet all year, humid continental climate (Dfa). Dfa climates are characterized by at least one month having an average mean temperature ≤ 32.0 °F (≤ 0.0 °C), at least four months with an average mean temperature ≥ 50.0 °F (≥ 10.0 °C), at least one month with an average mean temperature ≥ 71.6 °F (≥ 22.0 °C), and no significant precipitation difference between seasons. During the summer months, episodes of extreme heat and humidity can occur with heat index values ≥ 100 °F (≥ 38 °C). On average, the wettest month of the year is July which corresponds with the annual peak in thunderstorm activity. During the winter months, episodes of extreme cold and wind can occur with wind chill values < 0 °F (< −18 °C). The plant hardiness zone is 7a with an average annual extreme minimum air temperature of 0.0 °F (−17.8 °C).

Demographics

2010 census

The Census Bureau's 2006–2010 American Community Survey showed that (in 2010 inflation-adjusted dollars) median household income was $66,250 (with a margin of error of ± $8,281) and the median family income was $72,583 (± $13,355). Males had a median income of $49,861 (± $9,561) versus $42,361 (± $14,837) for females. The per capita income for the borough was $32,976 (± $3,402). About 8.2% of families and 8.7% of the population were below the poverty line, including 17.2% of those under age 18 and 1.1% of those age 65 or over.

2000 census
As of the 2000 United States census there were 5,216 people, 2,001 households, and 1,300 families residing in the borough.  The population density was 4,251.9 people per square mile (1,637.3/km2). There were 2,081 housing units at an average density of 1,696.4 per square mile (653.2/km2). The racial makeup of the borough was 76.53% White, 8.51% African American, 0.36% Native American, 2.28% Asian, 0.08% Pacific Islander, 9.64% from other races, and 2.59% from two or more races.  Hispanic or Latino of any race were 20.05% of the population.

There were 2,001 households, out of which 30.3% had children under the age of 18 living with them, 51.7% were married couples living together, 8.5% had a female householder with no husband present, and 35.0% were non-families. 27.9% of all households were made up of individuals, and 9.6% had someone living alone who was 65 years of age or older.  The average household size was 2.60 and the average family size was 3.15.

In the borough the population was spread out, with 22.5% under the age of 18, 8.0% from 18 to 24, 36.8% from 25 to 44, 21.9% from 45 to 64, and 10.8% who were 65 years of age or older.  The median age was 36 years. For every 100 females, there were 103.4 males. For every 100 females age 18 and over, there were 101.2 males.

The median income for a household in the borough was $64,299, and the median income for a family was $72,092. Males had a median income of $46,375 versus $35,428 for females.  The per capita income for the borough was $28,605.  About 4.3% of families and 7.3% of the population were below the poverty line, including 9.1% of those under age 18 and 4.4% of those age 65 or over.

As of the 2000 Census, 6.31% of Hightstown's residents identified themselves as being of Ecuadorian ancestry, which was the second highest of any municipality in New Jersey and the sixth highest percentage of Ecuadorian people in any place in the United States with 1,000 or more residents identifying their ancestry.

Government

Local government
Hightstown is governed under the Borough form of New Jersey municipal government, which is used in 218 municipalities (of the 564) statewide, making it the most common form of government in New Jersey. The governing body is comprised of the Mayor and the Borough Council, with all positions elected at-large on a partisan basis as part of the November general election. The Mayor is elected directly by the voters to a four-year term of office. The Borough Council is comprised of six members, who are elected to serve three-year terms on a staggered basis, with two seats coming up for election each year in a three-year cycle. The Borough form of government used by Hightstown is a "weak mayor / strong council" government in which council members act as the legislative body with the mayor presiding at meetings and voting only in the event of a tie. The mayor can veto ordinances subject to an override by a two-thirds majority vote of the council. The mayor makes committee and liaison assignments for council members, and most appointments are made by the mayor with the advice and consent of the council.

, the Mayor of the Borough of Hightstown is Democrat Susan Bluth, whose term of office ends on December 31, 2026. Borough Council members are Council President Joshua Jackson (D, 2025), Joseph Cicalese (D, 2023), Cristina Fowler (D, 2023), Todd Frantz (D, 2025), Jeet Gulati (D, 2024; appointed to serve an unexpired term) and Fred Montferrat (D, 2024).

The borough council appointed Jeet Gulati in February 2023 to fill the council seat expiring in December 2024 that had been held by Susan Bluth until she resigned the previous month to take office as mayor; Gulati will serve on an interim basis until the November 2023 general election, when voters will choose a candidate to fill the balance of the term of office.

In January 2019, the Borough Council selected Patricia Egan from a list of three candidates nominated by the Republican municipal committee to fill the seat expiring in December 2020 that became vacant the previous month following the resignation of Connor Montferrat. At that same meeting, the council chose Joshua Jackson from a list of three Democrats to fill the seat scheduled to expire in December 2019 that had been held by Denise "Denny" Hansen until she resigned from office in December 2018. In the November 2019 general election, Democrat Joseph Cicalese was elected to serve the balance of the term of office through December 2020.

In January 2015, the council selected former council president Susan Bluth to fill the vacant council seat expiring in December 2015 of Larry Quattrone, who left office when he was sworn in as mayor.

Seth Kurs was appointed in April 2014 from among three prospective candidates to fill the vacant seat expiring in 2015 of Gail Doran, who had resigned earlier in the month, citing personal reasons.  The term of the appointment ran through November 14, 2014, after which Seth Kurs was elected in the general election to complete the remaining unexpired term through December 31, 2015.

Federal, state, and county representation
Hightstown is located in the 3rd Congressional District and is part of New Jersey's 14th state legislative district. 

Prior to the 2011 reapportionment following the 2010 Census, Hightstown had been in the 12th state legislative district.

Politics
As of March 2011, there were a total of 2,891 registered voters in Hightstown, of which 1,105 (38.2%) were registered as Democrats, 542 (18.7%) were registered as Republicans and 1,241 (42.9%) were registered as Unaffiliated. There were 3 voters registered as Libertarians or Greens.

In the 2012 presidential election, Democrat Barack Obama received 64.6% of the vote (1,369 cast), ahead of Republican Mitt Romney with 33.4% (707 votes), and other candidates with 2.0% (42 votes), among the 2,308 ballots cast by the borough's 3,062 registered voters (190 ballots were spoiled), for a turnout of 75.4%. In the 2008 presidential election, Democrat Barack Obama received 66.8% of the vote (1,504 cast), ahead of Republican John McCain with 30.4% (685 votes) and other candidates with 1.6% (36 votes), among the 2,253 ballots cast by the borough's 2,962 registered voters, for a turnout of 76.1%. In the 2004 presidential election, Democrat John Kerry received 59.3% of the vote (1,254 ballots cast), outpolling Republican George W. Bush with 36.4% (771 votes) and other candidates with 0.9% (25 votes), among the 2,116 ballots cast by the borough's 2,776 registered voters, for a turnout percentage of 76.2.

In the 2013 gubernatorial election, Republican Chris Christie received 57.9% of the vote (765 cast), ahead of Democrat Barbara Buono with 38.8% (512 votes), and other candidates with 3.3% (44 votes), among the 1,341 ballots cast by the borough's 2,961 registered voters (20 ballots were spoiled), for a turnout of 45.3%. In the 2009 gubernatorial election, Republican Chris Christie received 46.2% of the vote (700 ballots cast), ahead of  Democrat Jon Corzine with 44.8% (679 votes), Independent Chris Daggett with 7.1% (107 votes) and other candidates with 1.1% (16 votes), among the 1,514 ballots cast by the borough's 2,908 registered voters, yielding a 52.1% turnout.

Education
Students in public school for pre-kindergarten through twelfth grade attend the East Windsor Regional School District, which serves students from East Windsor and Hightstown. As of the 2020–21 school year, the district, comprised of six schools, had an enrollment of 5,123 students and 466.0 classroom teachers (on an FTE basis), for a student–teacher ratio of 11.0:1. Public school students in seventh through twelfth grades from Roosevelt Borough (a community in Monmouth County are sent to the district's schools as part of a sending/receiving relationship with the Roosevelt Public School District. The seats on the nine-member board of education are allocated based on the population of the constituent municipalities, with two seats assigned to Hightstown.

Schools in the district (with 2020–21 enrollment data from the National Center for Education Statistics) are 
Walter C. Black Elementary School with 491 students in grades K–2, 
Ethel McKnight Elementary School with 539 students in grades K–2, 
Perry L. Drew Elementary School with 567 students in grades 3–5, 
Grace N. Rogers Elementary School with 561 students in grades Pre-K / 3–5, 
Melvin H. Kreps Middle School with 1,237 students in grades 6–8 and 
Hightstown High School with 1,658 students in grades 9–12.
Eighth grade students from all of Mercer County are eligible to apply to attend the high school programs offered by the Mercer County Technical Schools, a county-wide vocational school district that offers full-time career and technical education at its Health Sciences Academy, STEM Academy and Academy of Culinary Arts, with no tuition charged to students for attendance.

Hightstown is also home to the Peddie School, a coeducational, independent high school founded in 1864.

Historic district

The Stockton Street Historic District covers both sides of Stockton Street (County Route 571), from Railroad Avenue to Summit Street, and a portion of Rogers Avenue.  It is notable for its Victorian homes, First Methodist Church, and the Hightstown Civil War monument.  It is also significant for its association with the introduction of rail service to New Jersey, as the first railroad in the United States to connect two major cities, New York and Philadelphia. With the historical significance of Hightstown, in July 2015 it became a Preserve America community, aimed at enriching the community's historic preservation efforts.

Transportation

Roads and highways

Hightstown is located at the cross-roads of several major roads. The main highway through the borough is Route 33, which is also concurrent with County Route 539 (CR 539) and County Route 571 (CR 571). A small portion of U.S. Route 130 passes through the northwest corner and is accessible by Route 33, CR 571 and CR 539. Highways located just outside the borough include the New Jersey Turnpike (Interstate 95) and the "Hightstown Bypass" (Route 133), which both intersect with Route 33 at Exit 8 of the turnpike.

Public transportation
The Greater Mercer Transportation Management Association offers service on the Route 130 Connection between the Trenton Transit Center and South Brunswick. The Princeton Junction Shuttle connects East Windsor and Hightstown with the Princeton Junction Rail Station.

There is also direct service to New York, as well as other New Jersey communities on the Suburban Coach route 300 to and from the Port Authority Bus Terminal, Grand Central Terminal and other destinations in Midtown Manhattan and the 600 route to and from Downtown Manhattan / Wall Street.

Railroads
Hightstown was formerly served by the Camden & Amboy Railroad (C&A), the first chartered railway company in the state and the third-oldest in the United States. Service to Hightstown began in December 1831 using the British-built John Bull locomotive. C&A was acquired by the Pennsylvania Railroad (PRR) in 1871 after consolidating it with the United New Jersey Railroad and Canal Company. Ownership was later transferred to Penn Central (PC) in 1968, following by Conrail in 1976 after PC went bankrupt.

In early 1982, Conrail ended freight service to Hightstown on what was known as the Hightstown Industrial Track and filed for abandonment that fall. Trackage was removed in March 1983.

Notable people

People who were born in, residents of, or otherwise closely associated with Hightstown include:

 Kay B. Barrett (1902–1995), Hollywood talent scout who acquired the movie rights to the book Gone with the Wind
 Estelle Brodman (1914–2007), medical librarian and academic, lived in Hightstown after her retirement
 Howard Haycraft (1905–1991), writer, editor and publisher
 Hilly Kristal (1931–2007), founder and owner of the New York City music club CBGB
 Larry Kelley (1915–2000), football player who won the Heisman Trophy in 1936
 Desiree Lubovska (1893–1974), founded the American National Ballet School at Hightstown in 1921
 Doug Mastriano (born 1964), politician who is a retired Colonel of the United States Army and the state senator for Pennsylvania's 33rd District
 Worrall Frederick Mountain (1909–1992), Justice of the New Jersey Supreme Court from 1971 to 1979
 Elizabeth Greenleaf Pattee (1893–1991), architect, landscape architect and architecture professor
 Randal Pinkett (born 1971), business consultant who in 2005 was the winner of season four of the reality television show, The Apprentice
 Jonathan Sprout (born 1952), songwriter, performer and recording artist
 Martin Waldron (1925–1981), winner of the 1964 Pulitzer Prize for reporting on unchecked spending on the Florida Turnpike
 Charles L. Walters (–1894), politician who served in the New Jersey General Assembly
 Paul Watkins (born 1964), novelist
 John Archibald Wheeler (1911–2008), physicist
 Nick Williams (born 1990), wide receiver who has played in the NFL for the Washington Redskins
 John Woodruff (1915–2007), Gold Medalist at 800 metres at the 1936 Summer Olympics in Berlin

References

External links

 Hightstown Borough website
 Downtown Hightstown
 Hightstown East Windsor Historical Society

 
1853 establishments in New Jersey
Borough form of New Jersey government
Boroughs in Mercer County, New Jersey
Populated places established in 1853